Foothill, California may refer to:
Foothill, Los Angeles County, California
Foothill, Placer County, California
Foothill Farms, California
Foothill Ranch, Lake Forest, California